The Giolitti IV government of Italy held office from 30 March 1911 until 21 March 1914, a total of 1,087 days, or 2 years, 11 months and 19 days.

Government parties
The government was composed by the following parties:

Composition

References

Italian governments
1911 establishments in Italy
1914 disestablishments in Italy